Big's Backyard Ultra is the original backyard ultra, invented by Gary "Lazarus Lake" Cantrell of Bell Buckle, Tennessee. Participants run a 4.167-mile loop every hour, and are eliminated if they fail to complete a loop in an hour. The path of the loop is on trails during the day and along a road after dark. The distance of each loop is equal to 100 divided by 24, so that a competitor runs 100 miles for a full day of competition. There is no predefined finish.  The winner is the competitor who completes a loop that no other competitors complete. If no competitor outlasts every other competitor, there is no winner.

Past results

a.
b.

See also
Barkley Marathons

References

Annual sporting events in the United States
Sports competitions in Tennessee
Multiday races
Sports in Tennessee
Ultramarathons in the United States